Sung Yu-chi (born 16 January 1982 in Shulin, Taipei County (now New Taipei City), Taiwan) is a Taekwondo athlete from Republic of China. He competed at the 2008 Summer Olympics held in Beijing, China and won the bronze medal.

References

External links
 

1982 births
Living people
Olympic bronze medalists for Taiwan
Olympic taekwondo practitioners of Taiwan
Sportspeople from New Taipei
Taekwondo practitioners at the 2008 Summer Olympics
Olympic medalists in taekwondo
Taekwondo practitioners at the 2002 Asian Games
Taekwondo practitioners at the 2006 Asian Games
Medalists at the 2008 Summer Olympics
Asian Games medalists in taekwondo
Medalists at the 2002 Asian Games
Asian Games silver medalists for Chinese Taipei
World Taekwondo Championships medalists
21st-century Taiwanese people